Paul Anthony McNally (born 19 December 1949) is an English former professional footballer who played as an inside forward.

Career
Born in Consett, McNally joined Bradford City from Consett in June 1967. He made 3 league appearances for the club. He was released by the Bradford in 1969 and moved to Southern League Dover. After one season there he played at Ashford Town.

Sources

References

1949 births
Living people
English footballers
Consett A.F.C. players
Bradford City A.F.C. players
Dover F.C. players
Ashford United F.C. players
English Football League players
Association football inside forwards